The 1964 Brazilian coup d'état, colloquially known in Brazil as the Coup of 64, was a series of events in Brazil from March 31 to April 1 that led to the overthrow of President João Goulart by members of the Brazilian Armed Forces. The following day, with the military already in control of the country, the speaker of the Brazilian Congress came out in support of the coup and endorsed it by declaring vacant the office of the presidency (though Goulart never officially resigned). The coup put an end to the government of Goulart (also known as 'Jango'), a member of the Brazilian Labour Party, who had been democratically elected vice president in the same election in which conservative Jânio Quadros, from the National Labour Party and backed by the National Democratic Union, won the presidency.

Quadros had resigned in 1961, the same year of his inauguration, in a clumsy political maneuver to increase his popularity. Quadros anticipated that mass demonstrations would demand his return to office and strengthen his position, but he miscalculated. With the presidency vacant, according to the Brazilian Constitution, Quadros should have automatically been replaced by Goulart. Goulart, however, was on a diplomatic trip to the People's Republic of China at the time and, although a moderate nationalist, Goulart was accused of being a communist by right-wing militants, who tried to prevent him from taking office. After lengthy negotiations, led mainly by Tancredo Neves, Goulart's supporters and the right-wing reached an agreement under which the parliamentary system would replace the presidential system in the country. Goulart would continue as head of state, although weakened, and Neves would be named the prime minister.

In 1963, however, a referendum re-established the presidential system with Goulart as president. He took office with full powers, and during his rule several problems in Brazilian politics became evident, as well as disputes in the context of the Cold War, which helped destabilize his government. The Basic Reforms Plan (Reformas de Base) proposed by Goulart had the potential to socialize the profits of large companies. It was labelled as a "socialist threat" by right-wing sectors of society and of the military, which organized major demonstrations against the government in the Marches of the Family with God for Freedom (Marchas da Família com Deus pela Liberdade).

The coup brought to Brazil a military regime politically aligned to the interests of the United States government. This military dictatorship in Brazil lasted for 21 years, until 1985, when Neves was indirectly elected the first civilian president of Brazil since the 1960 elections.

Conspiracy against Goulart
Jânio Quadros resigned on August 25, 1961. At the time of his resignation, João Goulart was in the People's Republic of China on a foreign relations trip. On August 29, the Brazilian Congress heard and vetoed a motion to stop Goulart from being named the president, brought by the heads of the three branches of the military and some politicians, who claimed Goulart's inauguration would put the country "on the road to civil war." A compromise was reached. Brazil would become a parliamentary democracy, with Goulart as president. As such, he would be head of state, but with limited powers of head of government. Tancredo Neves was named as the new prime minister.

On January 6, 1963, Goulart successfully changed the system of government back to a presidential democracy in a referendum in which he won by a large margin. Goulart found himself back in power with a rapidly deteriorating political and economic situation. During this period, Goulart was politically isolated, with a foreign policy which was independent of any alignment. He openly criticized the Bay of Pigs invasion by the US, but criticized the Cuban regime of Fidel Castro during the Cuban Missile Crisis. 

The country's economic situation deteriorated rapidly. Attempts to stabilize the currency were financed by aid packages from the International Monetary Fund. His failure to secure foreign investment and curb domestic inflation put the country in a difficult situation which exacerbated social conflicts. 

On March 13, 1964, Goulart gave a speech where he promised to nationalize the country's oil refineries, as well as carry out "basic reforms" including rent control. This was followed by a large demonstration on March 19, where a conservative group marched on Praça da Sé, São Paulo, in a demonstration called "March of the Family with God for Freedom" against Goulart and his policies.

The Sailors' Revolt

The friction between the military and Goulart boiled over with his intervention in a revolt by sailors of the Brazilian Navy led by José Anselmo dos Santos, historically known as Cabo Anselmo, and later exposed as an agent provocateur. On March 25, 1964, nearly 2,000 sailors assembled in Rio de Janeiro, petitioning for better living conditions and pledging their support for Goulart's reforms. The Minister of the Navy, Sílvio Mota, ordered the arrest of the sailors leading the assembly. Mota sent a detachment of marines to arrest the leaders and break up the assembly, led by Rear Admiral Cândido Aragão. These marines ended up joining the assembly and remained with the other sailors.

Shortly after Aragão's refusal to arrest the leaders, Goulart issued orders prohibiting any invasion of the assembly location (the headquarters of the local metalworker's union), and sacked Sílvio Mota as Minister of the Navy. The following day, March 26, the Minister of Labor, Amauri Silva, negotiated a compromise, and the sailors agreed to leave the assembly building. They were promptly arrested for mutiny.

Goulart pardoned the sailors shortly afterward, provoking a public rift with the military. Soon after this, on March 30, 1964, the day before the coup, Goulart gave a speech to a gathering of sergeants, where he asked for the military's support for his reforms.

Coup

Run-up
In the United States, concerns over the state of the Brazilian President, Goulart, started as early as July 1962. A private meeting was set up between John F. Kennedy, Richard N. Goodwin, and Lincoln Gordon to discuss Goulart's activity in the military, and their concern over whether or not he was leading the country towards Communism. The discussion concluded that they would support paramilitary forces in opposition to Goulart and that they would send a "fellow" who was fluent in Portuguese to be their contact within the military. Kennedy said "I think one of our important jobs is to strengthen the spine of the military." 

On December 11, 1962, the Executive Committee (EXCOMM) of the National Security Council met to evaluate three policy alternatives on Brazil: to do nothing and allow the present drift to continue, to collaborate with Brazilian elements hostile to Goulart who were in favor of a coup, and to seek to change the political and economic orientation of Goulart and his government. At the time the U.S. felt the third option was the best selection, and would be tried before shifting to the second option. The attempt to reform Goulart's policy was selected as having the only feasible chance of success at the time. The choice to give support to the Goulart administration without political confrontation might be justified by the fact that there was an expectation that events in Brazil would lead to Goulart's early ouster or a change in his policies. At first, the U.S. attempted to work with President Goulart and convince him to change his political views and policies to a more pro-Western system of governance.

In December 1962, Bobby Kennedy flew to Brazil to meet with Goulart. Goulart and Kennedy spoke for three hours, with Kennedy outlining "the presence of Communists, ultranationalists (read nationalists), extreme leftists and anti-Americans in Goulart's government" as the main American objection to his government.

In March 1963, the Kennedy administration gave Goulart a choice: either he could remove the anti-American politicians from political power in Brazil, or the United States would put economic pressure on Brazil. On March 8, the Central Intelligence Agency (CIA) released a memorandum listing the current efforts within the Brazilian military to organize and attempt a coup. The document identifies that "conservative elements of the Brazilian military [were] formulating plans for a possible effort to depose President Joao Goulart." The report identifies Odylio Denys as having the "best-developed plan." Denys's plan relied on the "cooperation by military commanders in key state against the central government with recalcitrant governors being arrests by local commanders who would then replace them."  However, no military action would be taken unless prompted by Goulart because, as the report states, "the Brazilian military prides itself in the belief that... it does not act unconstitutionally." The report continues that if a coup were to happen too soon it would ruin any further attempts; additionally, more support must be proved to Denys in the form of governmental sabotage. Ultimately, the CIA expressed their belief that Denys could bring about a coup "by putting together a luck combination of well-placed military commanders."

During the final months of 1963, the Kennedy administration began to search for paramilitary forces capable of overthrowing the Goulart government. The coup was foreseen by both pro- and anti-Goulart forces. In Rio de Janeiro, Leonel Brizola, Goulart's brother-in-law and ally, had organized as far back as October 1963 so-called "Groups of Eleven", or groups of eleven people who would work in supporting Goulart's reforms, but could theoretically be converted to a form of militia in defense of Goulart's presidency. Many Kennedy administration officials, such as Gordon, U.S. Attorney General Robert Kennedy and U.S Latin America Advisor Richard N. Goodwin, also served in the Johnson administration.

On the other side, on March 20, 1964, 11 days before the coup, Humberto de Alencar Castelo Branco, chief of staff for the army, circulated a letter to the highest echelons of the military warning of the dangers of communism. Two cables from the U.S. Ambassador to Brazil Lincoln Gordon reveal his suspicions of President Goulart's communist sympathies, and his urging of the CIA to prepare to aid the revolt. The first, dated March 27, 1964, accuses Goulart of actively working with the Brazilian Communist Party, and recommends that the U.S. prepare to support anti-Goulart forces with arms and fuel, especially the General Castello Branco. In the same cable, Gordon mentions that several anti-Goulart groups had approached him in the past two years about the U.S. supporting a coup. He says that, out of all of them, General Branco was easily the best. In Gordon's opinion, he was the one that the U.S. should put their weight behind. He is very urgent in his message, saying that he is afraid of Brazil becoming "The China of the 1960s".  Finally, he urges for arms to be sent via an unmarked submarine at night as soon as possible. In a second cable, sent two days later on March 29, he takes a more urgent tone as Ambassador Gordon reports that the situation had "worsened" and "possibly shortened time factors", and advised that "earliest possible action would achieve optimum results." In a 28 March telegraph, Gordon said that the United States embassy was undertaking complementary measures to provide covert support "for pro-democracy street rallies (...) and encouragement [of] democratic and anti-communist sentiment in Congress, armed forces, friendly labor and student groups, church, and business" and that he "may be requesting modest supplementary funds for other covert action programs in the near future.". Retired Marshal Odylio Denys was Minister of War during president Janio Quadros' term and was a leader of the anti-Goulart group was in charge of developing the plan to overthrow Goulart. Denys and many Brazilian military men who were strongly against Goulart, however, would not initiate a revolutionary plan unless Goulart started any "attacks" that would win him support. The whole purpose was to protect their constitution, which they felt that Goulart disobeyed.

On March 30, the American military attaché in Brazil, Colonel Vernon A. Walters, telegraphed the State Department. In that telegraph, he confirmed that Brazilian army generals had committed themselves to act against Goulart within a week of the meeting, but no date was set. An Intelligence Information Cable from the same day reiterates the likelihood of a revolution "probably within the next few days", and outlines the movement of troops from São Paulo and Minas Gerais towards Rio de Janeiro once the revolt begins. They felt there would be no problems in Minas Gerais. The cable reports anticipation of problems in São Paulo, and warns that the revolution will be long and bloody, noting that "the position of the navy is uncertain and could add to the difficulties of the anti-Goulart forces." The air force base in Belo Horizonte had little to offer. They believed there would be no resistance or bloodshed. However, the cable also cites the division of the air force as beneficial to the aid of anti-Goulart forces. This included the commander Col. Afranio Aguiar who usually favored Goulart.

According to Declassified UK, the Information Research Department (IRD), a unit of the Foreign Office that acted as United Kingdom's covert propaganda arm during the Cold War, was used to push anti-communist propaganda in Brazil, and the British government supported the Instituto de Pesquisas e Estudos Sociais (IPES), a right-wing think tank whose aim was "organizing opposition to Goulart and maintaining dossiers on anyone de Paiva considered an enemy".

March 31
In the early hours of March 31, 1964, General Olímpio Mourão Filho, Commander of the 4th Military Region, headquartered in Juiz de Fora, Minas Gerais, ordered his troops to start moving towards Rio de Janeiro. The move was not coordinated with the other main generals in the plot, namely General Amaury Kruel of the 2nd Army (based in São Paulo) and Castello Branco, the deposed army chief of staff. The troop movement took them by surprise, as they felt it was too soon for a successful coup. Less than two hours after receiving news of Mourão's march, Kruel was reported saying "This is nothing more than a quartelada (military adventure, from quartel, Portuguese for "barracks") by General Mourão, and I will not join it." In the morning, Castello Branco would twice try to stop Mourão's march on Rio de Janeiro. At the same time, news of the march had reached General Argemiro Assis Brasil, João Goulart's military aide, who felt confident he could put the rebellion down. Despite this, the crucial support needed for the coup (that of General Kruel's 2nd Army) had not yet been implemented. At around 10:00 pm, General Kruel called João Goulart. Goulart replied that doing so would be a humiliating defeat for him, making him a "decorative president". Goulart told Kruel: "General, I don't abandon my friends. (...) I would rather stick with my grassroots. You should stick to your convictions. Put your troops out on the street and betray me, publicly."

After the 10:00 pm call, Kruel called Goulart two more times, repeating his demands, and receiving the same answer from Goulart. Goulart's attempt to revoke the generals was disastrous. Two of his three military chiefs of staff were out of action for various reasons. His military aide was a newly promoted Brigadier General, General Assis Brasil. His greatest base of military support was located in his native Southern Brazil. His reaction, orchestrated by Assis Brasil, consisted of shifting a general from the southern 3rd Army to the southeast, to replace Castello Branco (he never arrived). Of his other generals, in the states of Paraná and the Rio Grande do Sul, four were on vacation, while two others were returning to their posts in Curitiba when they were forced to land in Porto Alegre due to bad weather, and thus away from their commands. 

A telegram dated March 31, 1964, details some decisions the United States made in response to the coup being underway. The details highlighted the dispatch of US Navy tankers from Aruba, an immediate dispatch of a naval task force to go to Brazil, and initiation of a shipment of 110 tons of ammunition as well as other light equipment such as tear gas, made ready for a possible airlift to Viracopos Airport in Campinas;. Furthermore, the telegram also states that the actual deployment of these resources requires more discussion. The first tanker is to be off Santos between April 8 and 13, followed by three tankers at intervals of one day. An aircraft carrier, the USS Forrestal (CV-59) is to arrive on April 10, with four destroyers, two destroyer escorts, and task force tankers to arrive four days later.  The telegram states that the dispatch of tankers and the naval force was regarded by as normal naval exercise, and that it did not immediately involve the United States in the Brazilian situation. In a telephone conversation, United States President Johnson spoke on the phone from his Texas ranch with Undersecretary of State George Ball and Assistant Secretary for Latin America, Thomas Mann. Ball briefed Johnson on that status of military moves to overthrow Goulart's government, and Johnson stated, "I think we ought to take every step that we can, be prepared to do everything that we need to do." and "I'd get right on top of it and stick my neck out a little."

April 1
On April 1, at 12:45 pm, João Goulart left Rio de Janeiro for the capital, Brasília, in an attempt to stop the coup. He arrived at about 4:30 pm. Reservists were called up earlier in the day by the local military commander and were brought to the anti-aircraft headquarters in Brasília to try to protect Goulart. It was believed that their defense would only be able to delay his overthrow by about one day. At the same time, General Kruel and the 2nd Army began to march towards the Vale do Paraíba, between São Paulo and Rio de Janeiro. In the southeast, only the 1st Army, commanded by General Âncora and based in Rio de Janeiro, had not enlisted in the coup. General Artur da Costa e Silva called Âncora and demanded his surrender. Âncora replied he would honor a promise to Goulart and first meet to discuss the situation with General Kruel, who was marching in his direction. The meeting would take place later in the day at the Academia Militar de Agulhas Negras, in Resende, between Rio de Janeiro and São Paulo. At that meeting, Âncora surrendered the 1st Army. Goulart had no military support outside of the south. When he reached Brasília, Goulart realized he lacked any political support. The Senate president, Auro de Moura Andrade, was already articulating for congressional support of the coup. Goulart stayed for a short time in Brasília, gathering his wife and two children, and flying to Porto Alegre in an Air Force Avro 748 aircraft. Soon after Goulart departed, Auro Moura Andrade declared the position of President of Brazil "vacant". Seven people would die during the events of April 1. Casualties included two students who were shot amidst a demonstration against the troops encircling the Governor's palace in Recife, three in Rio and two in Minas Gerais. 

A telegram from the CIA on April 2 states that "the national council of government on 1 April approved a resolution to receive Goulart as president unless he had resigned before leaving Brazil." The telegram also reports that President Goulart had fled Brazil for Uruguay.At a White House meeting on 1st April, Secretary of Defense, Robert Strange McNamara, reported that the United States had military aid waiting for the proper Brazilian request. McNamara noted the existence of arms and ammunition waiting to be airlifted to Brazil from New Jersey, a Navy tanker that was being diverted from Aruba to Brazil, and a Norwegian boat headed to Buenos Aires with aviation fuel. A White House memorandum also dated the same day stated that the White House was unsure of his location due to the different intelligence reports that it had received about the situation. At the time of the memo, Gordon believed that the coup was "95% over" and that General Branco had "taken over Rio", and he informed that Branco "told us he doesn't need our help."

Aftermath

In the early hours of April 2 the National Congress declared the presidency to be vacant and Senate president Auro de Moura Andrade, along with the president of the Supreme Federal Tribunal, swore in Pascoal Ranieri Mazzilli, the speaker of the house, as president. This move was arguably unconstitutional at the time, as João Goulart was still in the country. At the same time Goulart, now in the headquarters of the 3rd Army in Porto Alegre (which was still loyal to him at the time), contemplated resistance and counter-moves with Leonel Brizola, who argued for armed resistance. In the morning, General Floriano Machado informed the president that troops loyal to the coup were moving from Curitiba to Porto Alegre and that he had to leave the country, risking arrest otherwise. At 11:45 am, Goulart boarded a Douglas C-47 transport for his farm bordering Uruguay. Goulart would stay at his farm until April 4, when he finally boarded the plane for the last time, heading for Montevideo. Mazzilli would continue as president while the generals jockeyed for power. On April 11, 1964, General Humberto de Alencar Castello Branco was elected President by the National Congress. Upon taking power, Castello Branco promised to "deliver, in 1966, to my successor legitimately elected by the people, a united nation." In 1967, he delivered what journalist Elio Gaspari dubbed "a fractured nation" to a president elected by 295 people.

A Washington Daily News article, titled "Castro Plots in Brazil Confirmed", asserts that "Brazil's new anticommunist regime has discovered hard evidence that Castro's Cuba was aiding subversion in their country." The article's premise is that this news firmly classifies Brazil as newly anti-Castro/Cuba. The piece extrapolates from this initial statement implication for other Organization of American States member states, mentioning two upcoming OAS meetings; the first was slated to deal with a "showdown over Cuban subversion," the second dealing with "the problem of coups." 

By May 1964, Brazil's break with Cuba was being recognized on the floor of the United States House of Representatives. Representative Paul G. Rogers of Florida addressed the Speaker of the House in 14 May 1964, saying that "credit is due the new Government of Brazil for ending diplomatic relations with the Communist regime of Cuba." His speech says that "the fall of leftist Joao Goulart's regime" helped Brazil reverse its course, "which seemed to be taking it away from the democratic community of the hemisphere." His remarks seem to collaborate the aforementioned Washington Daily News article, which considers the reaction of other countries. Specifically, Rogers predicts that Brazil will become a leader in "our sister continent," disregarding Cuba. Rogers calls out four other countries as being Cuba supporters—Chile, Bolivia, Mexico, and Uruguay—and publicly ask the OAS to utilize "stepped-up measures...to isolate Communist Cuba in this hemisphere."

Within two years, in accord with concessions promised to the U.S. government for its financial support of the overthrow, foreign companies gained control of about half of the Brazilian industry. This type of foreign intrusion was often accomplished through combined fiscal and monetary measures, "constructive bankruptcy" that caused the choice of selling out or going broke. By 1971, of the 19 of Brazil's 27 largest companies that were not state-owned, 14 were foreign-owned.

Arrests and interrogation 
In July 1972, a three-page telegram from the American Embassy in Brasilia to the US Secretary of State's office outlined the "Allegation of Torture in Brazil." The memo alludes to the "peak" of "allegations" of torture, as acknowledged by "high Brazilian officials," stretched from 1968 until the "first half of 1971." The memo credits the marked "reduction" in torture or allegations of torture to the "great part of GOB success in substantially reducing [the] number of active terrorists," but the memo acknowledges that "ample evidence" continues to reveal "harsh interrogation techniques are still being employed at regional and local levels, in some areas and by some security units more flagrantly than in others." "Rightly or wrongly," the telegram continued, "many Brazilians attribute the success of anti-terrorism program to the strength of measures employed against subversives and there are indications that most Brazilians exercising influence upon the regime are prepared to accept international criticism so long as the government considers these measures to be necessary." The American Embassy warned through the memo that US relations with Brazil remained fragile, arguing that "efforts by any branch of US government or by US political figures to bring pressure on Brazil would not only damage our general relations but, by equating reduction in anti-terror measures with weakness under pressure, could produce opposite of intended result." "[With] respect to new formulation contained in state 117951," the memo predicts, "it obviously would be impossible now or at any time in the future to be in a position realistically to certify that the GOB is not engaged in torture of political prisoners."

A number of reports reveal the numbers of suspects arrested in Brazil and the different techniques used to torture suspects during the process of interrogation. A report written on April 16, 1973 to the U.S. Department of State, "Widespread Arrests And Psychophysical Interrogation Of Suspected Subversive," gave specific details that accounted for what happened in Brazil. According to the report, there had been a dramatic increase in arrests in 1973, with a specific week period. The majority of the suspects were university students. These students were arrested within several weeks in the Rio area. When arrested and interrogated, the suspects were "submitted to the old methods of physical violence, which sometimes cause death." The increase in the number of suspects stemmed from the police report, especially on individuals who were jailed before.

Another report, dated April 18, 1973, highlighted that over 300 individuals were arrested for subversive activities. Though the report listed students as the most substantial portion of the arrests, individuals such as university professors, journalists, and physicians were also detained. The method for torture upon a suspect who was picked up usually began with the suspect being forced into a car at gunpoint by an undercover policeman. A veil was then placed over the detainee's head and he was then instructed to lie down in the back of the police vehicle while he was being transported. Upon arrival the captive was stripped naked and forced to sit in either a refrigerated or darken cell for several hours, with loudspeakers broadcasting screaming, sirens, and whistles at high-decibel levels. The suspect was then interrogated by agents, who informed him of the charges and told him how far they would go to extract the information from him. If the detainee was still unco-operative, he was subjected to increasingly-painful physical and mental torture, such as being placed in a room nude with a metal floor that had an electrical current pulsating through it. The suspect would be kept in that room for several hours. If the suspect did not yet confess, he would be transferred to other "special effects" room, all while he was denied food and water. Though the document references trials by military tribunals and arrests made by members of the military, the document also makes note of the use of the Brazilian police in the interrogation and torture process. Individuals labeled as hardened terrorists or known radical subversives usually faced an expedited execution process. A common practice for executions was to use a technique known as "the shootout technique," in which the executed subject was deemed to have died in a "shootout" with the police.

See also 

 History of Brazil (1945–1964)
 History of Brazil (1964–1985)
 Revolutions of Brazil
 Goulart family lawsuit against the USA

References

Further reading 
 Alfred C. Stepan. 1971. The Military in Politics: Changing Patterns in Brazil. Princeton University Press.
Corrêa, M. (2020). Military Resistance to the Brazilian Coup: The Fight of Officers and Soldiers against Authoritarian Rule, 1964–67. The Americas, 77(2), 275–300.

External links 
 Declassified documents from US Department of State and CIA about the 1964 coup (National Security Archive)
  
 Political songs of the Brazilian military regime 

Military coups in Brazil
Military dictatorship in Brazil
Brazil
Coup d'etat
Brazilian coup d'etat
Cold War in Latin America
Cold War conflicts
History of the foreign relations of the United States
Brazil–United States relations
March 1964 events in South America
April 1964 events in South America